The Porcupine River is a river in the James Bay and Moose River drainage basins in the city of Timmins, Cochrane District in northeastern Ontario, Canada. It flows  from Porcupine Lake to its mouth at Night Hawk Lake, the source of the Frederick House River, a tributary of the Abitibi River.

Course

Transportation
The Timmins/Porcupine Lake Water Aerodrome is on Porcupine Lake.

Tributaries
North Porcupine River
Porcupine Lake
Bob's Creek (right)
South Porcupine River (right)

See also
List of rivers of Ontario

References

Rivers of Cochrane District